The Mental Treatment Act 1930 was an Act of the Parliament of the United Kingdom permitting voluntary admission to, and outpatient treatment within, psychiatric hospitals. It also replaced the term "asylum" with "mental hospital".

It was repealed by the Mental Health Act 1959.

Further reading 
Digital Reproduction of the Original Act on the Parliamentary Archives catalogue

References 

Mental health legal history of the United Kingdom
United Kingdom Acts of Parliament 1930